Three Sappy People is a 1939 short subject directed by Jules White starring American slapstick comedy team The Three Stooges (Moe Howard, Larry Fine and Curly Howard). It is the 43rd entry in the series released by Columbia Pictures starring the comedians, who released 190 shorts for the studio between 1934 and 1959.

Plot
The Stooges are phone repairmen who are mistaken for the psychiatrists in whose office they are working, Drs. Z. Ziller (Curly), X. Zeller (Larry), and Y. Zoller (Moe). Wealthy J. Rumsford Rumford (Don Beddoe), upon the recommendation of a doctor friend of his, hires them to treat his impetuous, free-spirited young wife, Sherry Rumford (Lorna Gray). The Stooges ruin their clients' dinner party in their usual style, leading into a food fight, but because their antics so amuse his wife, her husband believes that she is cured and the Stooges are paid handsomely for their efforts. However, when the husband presents a birthday cake to his wife, he purposely drops the cake on the top of her head, ending her joyous frenzy.

Production notes
Three Sappy People was filmed on April 6–10, 1939. The film's title is a parody of the song title "Two Sleepy People." The short is also the sixth of sixteen Stooge shorts with the word "three" in the title.

During the pastry fight, 22-year-old Lorna Gray was treated on the set after a cream puff became lodged in her throat. However, in an interview later in her life, Gray stated that she actually was not in any danger and that it was instead director Jules White who was so concerned that he nearly ruined the take.

References

External links 
 
 

1939 films
The Three Stooges films
American black-and-white films
1939 comedy films
Films directed by Jules White
Columbia Pictures short films
American slapstick comedy films
1930s English-language films
1930s American films